Deaf world records in athletics are the best marks set in an event by a deaf person in the sport of athletics. The International Committee of Sports for the Deaf is responsible for ratification and it analyses each record before approving it. Records may be set in any continent and at any competition, providing that the correct measures are in place (such as wind-gauges) to allow for a verifiable and legal mark.

Men

Women

See also
List of deaf world records in swimming
List of World Deaf Swimming Championships records

References
World Deaf Records Men. CISS. Retrieved 2019-12-10.
World Deaf Records Women. CISS. Retrieved 2019-12-10.

External links
Official website of the International Committee of Sports for the Deaf

World deaf records
World deaf records
Deaf sports
World records